1995 Rugby League World Cup Group B was one of the three groups in the 1995 Rugby League World Cup. The group consisted of New Zealand, Papua New Guinea and Tonga.

Ladder

New Zealand vs Tonga
Tonga looked to be pulling off the shock of the 1995 World Cup when they came from 12–6 down to lead New Zealand 24–12 with 20 minutes to go in the game at Wilderspool Stadium. However, late tries to Hitro Okesene and Richie Blackmore (his second), both converted by Matthew Ridge who also landed a field goal in the dying moments, saved the Kiwis from an embarrassing loss.

Papua New Guinea vs Tonga
Tonga continued their good form to lead Papua New Guinea 20–0 at half time. However, the Kumuls came alive in the second half to pull out a 28–all draw.

New Zealand vs Papua New Guinea
New Zealand finally showed some good form with a 22–6 win over a game Papua New Guinea at Knowsley Road. The Kiwis lost first choice hooker Syd Eru before the game after he failed a drug test. The New Zealand team doctor confirmed the banned substance was part of an over the counter cough medicine Eru had taken for a cold, but the ban stood and he was out for the rest of the tournament. He was replaced at hooker by Gary Freeman playing his 45th and last test for New Zealand.

References

External links
1995 World Cup audio highlights
1995 World Cup Final at rlphotos.com
1995 World Cup data at hunterlink.net.au
1995 World Cup at rlif.com
1995 World Cup at rlhalloffame.org.uk
1995 World Cup at rugbyleagueproject.com
1995 World Cup at 188-rugby-league.co.uk